Accinctapubes amplissima is a species of snout moth in the genus Accinctapubes. It was described by Solis and Styer, in 2003, and is known from Costa Rica.

References

Moths described in 2003
Endemic fauna of Costa Rica
Epipaschiinae
Moths of Central America